Deforestation in India is the widespread destruction of major forests in India. It is mainly caused by environmental degradation by stakeholders such as farmers, ranches, loggers and plantation corporations. In 2009, India ranked 10th worldwide in the amount of forest loss, where world annual deforestation is estimated as  a year.

History

Deforestation started with the growth of agriculture,  but was exacerbated in the nineteenth century when British commercial forestry operations destroyed forests in mountain areas of Kerala, Tamil Nadu and Karnataka. The Gangetic plains have been almost completely deforested for agriculture.

Dynamics
Several causes supported deforestation, including colonization, agricultural expansion, firewood collection, timber harvesting and extension of cultivation on slopes. In the Indian Himalayas debris thrown down slopes due to reckless use of excavator machines for widening of roads and making of new roads has completely destroyed vast areas of Forest.  Due to the colonization from all over the country trees are cut down as a primary source of fuel. These trees are used for cooking food and other daily needs which require fuel.

Results

Deforestation has affected the lives of wild animals and birds including bats. Due to deforestation India is facing water problems in urban cities and villages.

See also 
 Environmental issues in India

References

India
Forestry in India
Environmental issues in India